Mahmoud Ahmed Sherifo (born 1948), commonly known simply as Sherifo,  served briefly as the Head of State of Eritrea while the President was away. He joined the Eritrean Liberation Front in 1967. He was an independent activist during Eritrea's war of independence from Ethiopia. Post-independence, he served in various capacities as Minister of Foreign Affairs and Minister of Local Government.

In September 2001 he was detained indefinitely along with other politicians who were known as the G-15, a group which opposed the rule of Eritrean president Isaias Afewerki. Mahmud along with 15 other ministers were arrested by the ruling front and detained in unknown location ever since. The ministers were criticizing the border war of the then president, Isaia and signed an open letter. Amnesty International has named him a prisoner of conscience and called for his immediate release in 2011.

Political career

He joined the Eritrean Liberation Front in 1967. He was an independent activist during Eritrea's war of independence from Ethiopia. Post-independence, he served as the Minister of Foreign Affairs before his last posting as Minister of Local Government. During this time he was also appointed Chairman of the Committee to prepare the draft laws concerning the first round of National Elections and the Political Party laws. Once the drafts were completed the Chairman of the National Assembly (and President), Isaias Afewerki summoned a report on the drafts. Mahmoud Ahmed Sherifo was detained for his hazy role (schemes that occurred on May 19, 1993), and for orchestrating a coup d'état in 2001.

Arrest
He has been detained since 2001 following the G-15 affair. Dissidents suggest he has been detained for campaigning for democratic reforms, while official sources contend that his detention is a consequence of "discreetly...solicit[ing] support in government circles for ousting the president, and to seek US and UN intervention to end the war on Ethiopia's surrender terms" while being detained. In September 2001 he was detained indefinitely along with other politicians who were known as the G-15, a group which opposed the rule of Eritrean president Isaias Afewerki. Mahmud along with 15 other ministers were arrested by the ruling front and detained in unknown location ever since. The ministers were criticizing the border war of the then president, Isaia and signed an open letter. He was fired along with other opposing members and was detained on 18 September 2001. He was considered a prisoner of conscience by Amnesty International. Although Eritrea has no post of vice president, nonetheless some sources have listed Sherifo as the vice president, and continue to do so (2006).

Amnesty International has named him a prisoner of conscience and called for his immediate release.

References

1948 births
People from Southern Region (Eritrea)
Amnesty International prisoners of conscience held by Eritrea
Eritrean diplomats
Eritrean prisoners and detainees
Possibly living people
People's Front for Democracy and Justice politicians
Government ministers of Eritrea
Foreign ministers of Eritrea
Vice presidents